The Sold Grandfather is a 1942 German comedy film directed by Joe Stöckel and starring Josef Eichheim, Oskar Sima and Winnie Markus. It was based on a play which was later adapted into a 1962 film of the same name.

It was shot at the Bavaria Studios in Munich and on location around Maria Alm in Austria. The film's sets were designed by the art directors Kurt Dürnhöfer and Max Seefelder.

Cast

References

Bibliography 
 Alfred Krautz. International directory of cinematographers, set- and costume designers in film, Volume 4. Saur, 1984.

External links 
 

1942 films
1942 comedy films
German comedy films
Films of Nazi Germany
1940s German-language films
Films directed by Joe Stöckel
German films based on plays
Bavaria Film films
Films shot at Bavaria Studios
German black-and-white films
1940s German films